Jakub Kudlička (born 10 January 1999) is a Slovak football midfielder who currently plays for Tatran Oravské Veselé.

Club career

MFK Ružomberok
Kudlička made his professional Fortuna Liga debut for Ružomberok against ViOn Zlaté Moravce on 17 September 2016.

References

External links
 MFK Ružomberok official club profile
 
 Futbalnet profile

1999 births
Living people
Sportspeople from Ružomberok
Slovak footballers
Slovakia youth international footballers
Association football midfielders
MFK Ružomberok players
FC Petržalka players
TJ Tatran Oravské Veselé players
Slovak Super Liga players
2. Liga (Slovakia) players
3. Liga (Slovakia) players